, also known mononymously as Juri, is a Japanese singer based in South Korea. She is a member of South Korean girl group Rocket Punch and former member of the Japanese girl group AKB48.

Career

2011-2018: AKB48

Takahashi passed AKB48's 12th generation auditions on 20 February 2011. In March 2012, she was promoted to the newly created Team 4, but was transferred to Team A in August 2012 when original Team 4 was disbanded. In February 2014, Takahashi was briefly transferred to Team B. In March 2015, Takahashi was transferred back to Team 4 (which was reformed in 2013) and appointed its captain. She would lead the team for nearly three years before being transferred to Team B as its Captain in December 2017, where she would remain until graduation in May 2019.

Takahashi would go on to participate in 16 A-side and 30 B-side songs, as well as a variety of television dramas, movies, variety shows and stage plays in her 7-year tenure.

In the group's General Elections in 2014, Takahashi ranked for the first time at 28th. In 2015, she ranked at 25th. In 2016, she ranked at 15th, making it the first time she entered the Senbatsu. In 2017, she ranked at 11th place, the highest rank she will achieve in a general election. In 2018, she ranked at 12th place. In 2018, Takahashi participated in Produce 48 and was ranked #16.

2019-present: Rocket Punch

On 4 March 2019, Takahashi announced she was graduating from AKB48 in May 2019. In the same report, she revealed she had signed an exclusive contract with the South Korean label Woollim Entertainment, after they e-mailed her.

On 23 July 2019, Takahashi was announced as a member of Rocket Punch, a new six-member girl group from Woollim. The group debuted on 7 August 2019, with their first extended play (EP) Pink Punch. In 2020, Takahashi ran a series of vlogs on Rocket Punch's YouTube channel titled Juriful Days.

Takahashi recorded with her label mate Eunbi the song 'I'll Be Your Energy' (에픽세븐 OST 'Energetic'), released on January 18, 2022.

Discography

Appearances

Stage units
AKB48 Team 4 1st Stage 
 
Team A Waiting Stage
 
 
 
AKB48 Team B 3rd Stage  (Revival)

TV variety
  (2011–2016)
  (2012)
  (2011–2018)
 AKBingo! (2012–2018)
  (2012–2016)
  (2014)
 Produce 48 (2018)
 King of Mask Singer (2020)

Web shows 
 Qoo10 ON AIR (2022, Host)

TV dramas
  (NTV, 2012) – Messi
 So Long 1st Night (NTV, 2013)
  (TV Tokyo, 2014), Mutsumi Oyamada
  (NTV, 2015), Uonome (Team Hinabe)
  (NTV, Hulu, 2015), Uonome (Team Hinabe)
  Ep.39 – Hide and Seek (TV Asahi, 2016), Yumi
  Ep.25 – Drama Love (TV Asahi, 2016), Kanako
   (NTV, 2016), Uonome (Iwashi)

Movies
  (2012)

References

1997 births
Living people
21st-century Japanese women singers
21st-century Japanese singers
AKB48 members
Japanese expatriates in South Korea
Japanese women pop singers
Japanese idols
Japanese K-pop singers
Japanese-language singers
K-pop singers
Korean-language singers of Japan
Musicians from Ibaraki Prefecture
Produce 48 contestants